Słajsino  is a village in the administrative district of Gmina Nowogard, within Goleniów County, West Pomeranian Voivodeship, in north-western Poland.

In the past the area formed part of Poland, the Duchy of Pomerania, the Kingdom of Prussia, and from 1871 to 1945 it was part of Germany. When part of Nazi Germany, a forced labour subcamp of the Nazi prison in Szczecin was operated in the village. After Germany's defeat in World War II, the region became again part of Poland.

References

Villages in Goleniów County